LSO may refer to:

Computing
 Large segment offload, a technology for reducing CPU overhead
 Local shared object, an HTTP cookie-like data entity used by Adobe Flash Player
 Location search optimization, a web optimization method

Organisations
 LSO (company), a delivery company formerly known as Lonestar Overnight
 Law Society of Ontario, the regulatory body for lawyers in Ontario, Canada (formerly called the Law Society of Upper Canada)
 Limburg Symphony Orchestra or Limburgs Symfonie Orkest, a Dutch orchestra
 London School of Osteopathy, an osteopathic school in London, England
 London Symphony Orchestra, a United Kingdom symphony orchestra

Other uses
 Lateral superior olive, an auditory nucleus in the brainstem
 Lutetium orthosilicate, an inorganic scintillator
 Landing Signal Officer, a naval aviator
 Lesotho (ISO 3166-1 code)
 Linguistic Sign-Off